Nassau is an unincorporated community in eastern Sussex County, Delaware, United States. It lies just off Delaware Route 1 west of the city of Lewes and northeast of the town of Georgetown, the county seat of Sussex County.  Its elevation is 26 feet (8 m).  It has a post office with the ZIP code 19969.

Nassau, like much of central Delmarva, is part of the Salisbury, Maryland-Delaware Metropolitan Statistical Area. The Delaware Coast Line Railway passed through Nassau on its way to its customer in Lewes, SPI Pharma, and maintained a run-around track in Nassau to facilitate the moves to SPI Pharma, the locomotive using the run-around to then continue pushing the consist of tankcars and/or covered hoppers over the trackage between Nassau and Lewes to the end-of-track for the Lewes Branch at SPI Pharma, just outside the main entrance to Cape Henlopen State Park. The last train run was in 2017.  The ROW is now a bike and pedestrian trail.

References

External links

Unincorporated communities in Sussex County, Delaware
Unincorporated communities in Delaware